The Calder Cup is the trophy awarded annually to the playoff champions of the American Hockey League. It was first presented in 1937 to the Syracuse Stars.

The cup is made of sterling silver mounted on a base of Brazilian mahogany. In its current shape, the trophy has a two-tiered square base with commemorative plaques for each of the AHL's 20 most recent champions: 12 on the bottom tier and 8 on the top tier. Each time a new championship plaque is added, the oldest plaque is retired and joins a display at the Hockey Hall of Fame in Toronto.

The Hershey Bears have won the Cup more times than any other team, with eleven victories in franchise history. The Cleveland Barons come in second with nine; the Springfield Indians/Kings are third with seven. Eight teams have won back-to-back championships; the Springfield Indians of 1960–62 are the only team to have won three straight Calder Cup championships.

On three occasions an AHL club has won the Calder Cup coincidentally with its NHL affiliate winning the Stanley Cup: in 1976 and 1977 when the Montreal Canadiens and their AHL affiliate, the Nova Scotia Voyageurs both won, and in 1995, when the New Jersey Devils and Albany River Rats both won.

The Calder Cup was not awarded in 2020 and 2021 as the AHL did not hold a playoff due to effects of the COVID-19 pandemic.

History
The trophy is named after Frank Calder, who was the first president of the National Hockey League. The Calder Memorial Trophy, which is awarded annually to the Rookie of the Year in the National Hockey League, was also named after Calder.

As a result of the COVID-19 pandemic, the 2019–20 AHL season was cancelled and the Calder Cup was not awarded in 2020. Previously, it had been the oldest continuously awarded professional ice hockey playoff trophy, having been presented annually from 1936–37 to 2018–19.

See also
 List of Calder Cup champions

References
Notes

Citations

External links
Official AHL website
Official Calder Cup website
AHL Hall of Fame
Historic standings and statistics - at Internet Hockey Database
Intotheboards.net Playoffs

1